Antifascist Committee of Soviet Women (AKSZh) also known as the Committee of Soviet Women, was a state women's organization in Soviet Russia, founded in 1941. It was renamed to Committee of Soviet Women in 1956. 

It was a state organization and a branch of the Communist Party of the Soviet Union. 

In 1930, the Zhenotdel had been dissolved because women's issues were officially regarded to have been solved in Soviet Russia. In 1941, however, the Antifascist Committee of Soviet Women was founded to promote the Soviet women's model internationally, specifically the Soviet woman's capacity to successfully combine the role of mother, worker and citizen: on a congress in Paris in 1945, it took the initiative to found the Women's International Democratic Federation for the same purpose.

It was dissolved in 1992 and succeeded by the Union of Women of Russia.

References

 

Social history of Russia
Women's organizations based in Russia
History of women in Russia
Political organizations
Organizations established in 1941
1992 disestablishments